Sophronius II, (? – 19 October 1780) served as Ecumenical Patriarch of Constantinople during the period 1775–80 and, as Sophronius V (Σοφρώνιος Ε΄), Greek Orthodox Patriarch of Jerusalem in 1771–75.

He was born in Aleppo, Syria.

He served as metropolitan bishop of Ptolemais (of the Greek Orthodox Church of Jerusalem) and in 1771 he was elected Greek Orthodox Patriarch of Jerusalem as Sophronius V.

In 1775, he was elected Ecumenical Patriarch of Constantinople as Sophronius II. During his reign, a Synod in Constantinople condemned the Kollyvades.

He was an educated and ascetic Patriarch and was especially preoccupied with education and the economics of the Patriarchates he ministered. He died on 19 October 1780 and was buried in the yard of the Church of the Asomatoi (Pammegiston Taxiarchon) in Arnavutköy.

Sources 
 Οικουμενικό Πατριαρχείο

References 

Sophronius 
Syrian bishops
People from Aleppo
1780 deaths
18th-century Ecumenical Patriarchs of Constantinople